Śliwiczki  is a village in the administrative district of Gmina Śliwice, within Tuchola County, Kuyavian-Pomeranian Voivodeship, in north-central Poland.

The village has a population of 437.

In 1942, the German occupiers changed the name of the village to Schliewitzhof . In the years 1975–1998, the town administratively belonged to the Bydgoszcz Province . According to the National Census (March 2011), it had 437 inhabitants  . It is the third largest town in the Śliwice commune. There is a primary school in Śliwiczki .

The UTC time is UTC+2.

References

Villages in Tuchola County